The Connecticut Constitution were a professional ultimate team based in New Britain, Connecticut. They were one of eight teams to take part in the American Ultimate Disc League's inaugural 2012 season. The team was in the Eastern Division of the AUDL. They played their first game on April 14, 2012, defeating the Rhode Island Rampage 29–23.

On July 5, 2012, the Connecticut Constitution announced that they would be suspending all team operations as the result of financial strain assumed during a lawsuit filed against the Constitution and Rhode Island Rampage by the AUDL.  On July 11 the organization lifted the suspension for the remainder of the season. The team did not return for the 2013 season, and officially folded.

Roster

References

Further reading

External links 
 
Ultimate (sport) teams
Sports teams in Connecticut
Ultimate teams established in 2012
Ultimate teams disestablished in 2012
2012 establishments in Connecticut
2012 disestablishments in Connecticut
Sports in New Britain, Connecticut
Defunct sports teams in Connecticut